Mitochondrial uncoupling protein 3 is a protein that in humans is encoded by the UCP3 gene. The gene is located in chromosome (11q13.4) with an exon count of 7 (HGNC et al., 2016) and is expressed on the inner mitochondrial membrane. Uncoupling proteins transfer anions from the inner mitochondrial membrane to the outer mitochondrial membrane, thereby separating (or uncoupling) oxidative phosphorylation from synthesis of ATP, and dissipating energy stored in the mitochondrial membrane potential as heat. Uncoupling proteins also reduce generation of reactive oxygen species.

Function 
Mitochondrial uncoupling protein 3 (UCP3) is a members of the larger family of mitochondrial anion carrier proteins (MACP). UCPs facilitate the transfer of anions from the inner to the outer mitochondrial membrane and transfer of protons from the outer to the inner mitochondrial membrane, reducing the mitochondrial membrane potential in mammalian cells. The exact mechanisms of how UCPs transfer H+/OH− are not known. In addition to UCP1, UCP3 is an important mediator of thermogenesis.

Protein expression 
Uncoupling proteins are transporters in mitochondrial membrane which deplete the proton gradient. UCP1 is highly expressed in brown adipocytes, UCP2 is variably expressed in many different tissues, and UCP3 is expressed primarily in skeletal muscle. At amino acid level human UCP3 is 71% equivalent to UCP2. UCP3 i

Associated SNPs 
UCP3 were confirmed containing four single nucleotide polymorphism rs1800849, rs11235972, rs1726745 and rs3781907. There was high impact score of rs11235972 GG genotype thus showing association of UCP3 gene polymorphism and nonalcoholic fatty liver disease in Chinese children (Xu YP et al., 2013)
The research of counterfeits in two independent population there was a similarity between the -55CT mutation of UCP3 and lower BMI. This affiliation was being modulated by the energy intake, hence deriving the undefined effect of diet and partly association of inconsistencies of prior related studies.

Structure 

UCPs contain the three homologous protein domains of MACPs.

Gene regulation 

This gene has tissue-specific transcription initiation with other transcription initiation sites upstream of SM-1 (major skeletal muscle site). Chromosomal order is 5'-UCP3-UCP2-3'. Two splice variants have been found for this gene.

Disease association 

Mutations in the UCP3 gene are associated with obesity.
UCP3 plays an essential role in obesity. A mutation in exon 3 (V102I) was diagnosed in an obese and diabetic. A mutation initializing a stop codon at exon 4 (R143X) and a mutation in the splice donor junction of exon 6 was analyzed in a compound heterozygote which was unnaturally obese and diabetic. Allele frequency of exon 3 and exon 6 splice at an alliance mutation were analyzed to be similar in African American and mende tribe and was absent in Caucasians. Exon 6–splice donor being heterozygotes, fat oxidation rates was reduced by 50%, initiating a role for UCP3 in metabolic fuel partitioning.
UCP3 (uncoupling protein) deliberates the hypoxia resistance to the renal epithelial cells and its upregulation in renal cell carcinoma.
The energy consumption of modulated and the association of -55CT polymorphism of UCP3 with the body weight and in type 2 diabetic patients.

Inhibitors 
Since protein UCP3 is affecting the long chain fatty acid metabolism and preventing cytosolic triglyceride storage. Telmisartan being an inhibitor by proven studies on rat skeletal muscle and improving the mutant protein activity and also its involvement in the dominant negative UCP3 mutants(C V Musa et al., 2012). Hence, novel UCP3 gene variants which associated to childhood obesity and even the effect of fatty acid oxidation prevention in triglyceride storage(C V Musa et al., 2012).

Interactions 

UCP3 has been shown to interact with YWHAQ.
Uncoupling protein UPC2 and uncoupling protein UPC3 interaction with members of the 14.3.3 family (Benoit pierrat et al., 2000).
Uncoupling protein (UCP3) modulating the process of Sarco/endoplasmic reticulum Ca2+-ATPase (SERCA) by declining the mitochondrial ATP fabrication (De Marchi U et al., 2011).

See also 
 Uncoupling protein

References

Further reading